My Sri Lanka with Peter Kuruvita is a 10-part Australian cooking television series created by The Precinct Studios that originally aired on SBS One on 3 November 2011 until 5 January 2012. It is presented by Australian born Sri Lankan chef Peter Kuruvita.

Description
The series was shot on various locations including some most popular tourists destinations like Kandy, Sigiriya etc. around Sri Lanka. For each episode he prepares a dish unique to the visited area. The program originally aired on SBS from 2011 November.

Episodes

Awards
Finalist 2012 Banff Rockies Program Competition Lifestyle & Information Programs.
Nominee 2012 Logie Award Most Popular New Male Talent.

See also
Peter Kuruvita

References

External links
EPISODES
TRY SOME RECIPES

Special Broadcasting Service original programming
Australian cooking television series
2011 Australian television series debuts
2012 Australian television series endings